Ikanogavialis is an extinct genus of gavialid crocodilian. Fossils have been found in the Urumaco Formation in Urumaco, Venezuela and the Solimões Formation of Brazil. The strata from which remains are found are late Miocene in age, rather than Pliocene as was once thought. A possible member of this genus survived into the Late Holocene on Muyua or Woodlark Island in Papua New Guinea.

Description 
Ikanogavialis had a dorsoventrally deep snout and a distinctive notch between the dentary and maxillary alveoli. The external nares projected anterodorsally from the rostrum. This can be seen as a plesiomorphic characteristic in crocodilians, but given that the earliest gavialoids possessed dorsally projecting external nares, this feature can be seen as having been a reversal from the gavialoid apomorphy back to the crocodilian plesiomorphy rather than having been directly obtained from an early crocodilian ancestor.

Species 
The type species of Ikanogavialis is I. gameroi. It was named in 1970 from material found from the Urumaco formation of Venezuela, South America.

Additionally, a Pleistocene gavialoid found on Woodlark Island of Papua New Guinea was initially named Gavialis papuensis in 1905, but has since been proposed to be a member of Ikanogavialis, although the poor quality of the preserved material makes it difficult to determine.

Paleobiology 
Ikanogavialis may have lived in a coastal paleoenvironment along with other gavialids such as Gryposuchus. The strata of the Urumaco formation were deposited in both marine and fluvial settings, although it is unclear to which portion both genera belong. Other gavialoids such as  Siquisiquesuchus and Piscogavialis are known to have lived in coastal environments, and it is likely that extant freshwater gavialoids such as Gavialis may have originated from these coastal forms. Ikanogavialis also existed with many other crocodilians in Venezuela during the late Miocene including the giant caiman Purussaurus and an extinct species of Melanosuchus.

"Gavialis" / Ikanogavialis papuensis was similarly fully marine, having been found in association with sea turtles and sirenians. It represents the youngest fully marine crocodilian to date.

Phylogeny 
A phylogenetic analysis conducted in a 2007 study found Gryposuchinae to include the genera Aktiogavialis, Gryposuchus, Ikanogavialis, Piscogavialis, and Siquisiquesuchus. Below is a cladogram from the 2007 analysis showing the phylogenetic relationships of gryposuchines among gavialoids:

Alternatively, a 2018 tip dating study by Lee & Yates simultaneously using morphological, molecular (DNA sequencing), and stratigraphic (fossil age) data indicated that the members of Gryposuchinae may in fact be paraphyletic and rather an evolutionary grade towards Gavialis and the gharial, as shown in the cladogram below:

Notes and references

External links
Ikanogavialis in the Paleobiology Database

Gavialidae
Prehistoric pseudosuchian genera
Neogene crocodylomorphs
Miocene reptiles of South America
Montehermosan
Huayquerian
Chasicoan
Mayoan
Neogene Brazil
Fossils of Brazil
Neogene Venezuela
Fossils of Venezuela
Prehistoric marine reptiles
Holocene extinctions
Fossil taxa described in 1970
Pleistocene crocodylomorphs